Rhopalostylis sapida, commonly known as nīkau, is a palm tree endemic to New Zealand, and the only palm native to mainland New Zealand.

Etymology
 is a Māori word; in the closely related Eastern Polynesian languages of the tropical Pacific, it refers to the fronds or the midrib of the coconut palm (niu).

Distribution

The nīkau palm is the only palm species endemic to mainland New Zealand. Its natural range is coastal and lowland forest on the North Island, and on the South Island as far south as Okarito (43°20′S) in the west and Banks Peninsula (43°5′S) in the east.  It also occurs on Chatham Island and Pitt Island/Rangiauria to the south-east of New Zealand, where it is the world's southernmost palm at 44° 18'S latitude.

Nīkau grow up to 15 m tall, with a stout, green trunk which bears grey-green leaf scars. The trunk is topped by a smooth, bulging crownshaft up to 1 m long. The fronds are up to 3 m long, and the closely set, sometimes overlapping leaflets are up to 1m long. The inflorescence is multibranched and from 20 to 40 cm long. The tightly packed flowers are unisexual and coloured lilac to pink. Male flowers are borne in pairs, and have six stamens. The female flowers are solitary. The fruit is elliptic or oblong, and generally measures about 10 by 7 mm, and is red when ripe. Nīkau produce flowers between November and April, and fruit ripens from February to November, taking almost a year to fully ripen. These are a preferred food of the kererū (native pigeon).

Cultivation 

 
Nīkau make an excellent potted plant, and are quite hardy. They tend to be slow-growing. They grow readily from seed if the fruit is soaked in water for a few days and then gently scrubbed to remove the flesh. The seed will then germinate readily if placed in sealed plastic bags in partial shade, after which they can be planted in deep pots. The pots should be tall and narrow to provide room for the taproot and to lessen the likelihood of root damage when transplanting.

Transplanting juveniles is generally successful if the main root is left intact. Nīkau do not have a true tap root. Once the main root has been established to a fairly shallow depth of about 400 mm, roots take on form consistent with other palms. Successful transplanting is possible, but nīkau are very fickle if any trunk is present. It is best done in summer, but a substantial root ball should be preserved, and shade should be provided at the new location – at the very least by tying the outer fronds closer to the centre. Ground watering is recommended because crown watering can induce terminal rot at the very slow-growing new spike. Delays should be avoided in getting nīkau into new ground, and substantial die-back of all but the central spike can be expected.

Nīkau thrive on cool temperatures, but are not commonly subject to freezing weather in their natural habitat. They can survive a few degrees of frost, but are damaged even more severely by sudden large drops in temperature even above freezing. Nīkau grow well in areas with a mild Mediterranean climate.

Variation

The nīkau palm shows considerable variation in the wild. Plants from the South Island and the offshore islands of the North Island have larger, more-gracefully-arching fronds and are popular in cultivation. The Chatham Islands form is particularly different, having a distinct juvenile form and larger fruits, and a thicker covering of fine hairs on the fronds. More research is needed into its precise relationship with the mainland form. The New Zealand nīkau palm is very similar to Rhopalostylis baueri of the Kermadecs and Norfolk Island, which can be distinguished by its more rounded or oval fruits, and by its leaflets which are broader than those found in most populations of R. sapida.

Uses
Māori found many uses for nīkau. The bases of the inner leaves and the young flower clusters were eaten raw or cooked. Food was wrapped in the leaves for cooking, and the old fibrous leaves were used for kete, floor mats, and waterproof thatch for buildings. Nīkau were a versatile material to use in weaving, as the fibres could be used raw without any need for processing.

Note

sapida
Trees of New Zealand
Trees of mild maritime climate
Ornamental trees
Conservation dependent plants
Taxa named by Carl Georg Oscar Drude